The 2014 Asian Five Nations, known as the 2014 HSBC Asian 5 Nations due to the tournament's sponsorship by the HSBC, was the 7th and final series of the Asian Five Nations rugby union tournament, before it shrinks to only include the top 3 Asian teams from 2015.

Japan, as victors, qualified for the 2015 Rugby World Cup as Asia 1 in Pool B, while the runner up, Hong Kong, qualified for the repechage playoffs, against Uruguay. In additional qualifications, only the top three teams would play in the leading tier in 2015, after the ARFU reduced the top tier from five, to three.

Changes from 2013
 United Arab Emirates has been replaced with Sri Lanka, who earns promotion from Division 1.

Teams
The teams involved are:

Final Table

Points are awarded to the teams as follows:

Fixtures

Round 1

Round 2

Round 3

Round 4

Round 5

Media coverage
The tournament is broadcast live in many different countries.

References

External links
Official Website
ARFU

Asian
2014
Five Nations
Five Nations
2014 in South Korean sport
2014 in Hong Kong sport
2014 in Philippine sport
2014 in Sri Lankan sport